The 1949 Miami Redskins football team was an American football team that represented Miami University during the 1949 college football season. In their first season under head coach Woody Hayes, the Redskins compiled a 5–4 record and outscored all opponents by a combined total of 251 to 163. Bo Schembechler played at the tackle position on the team.

Schedule

References

Miami
Miami RedHawks football seasons
Miami Redskins football